is a Japanese manga series by Minoru Itō. It has been adapted into a live action TV drama series.

Cast
 Izumi Inamori – Satsuki Noguchi
 Masaki Okada – Naoto
 Osamu Mukai – Tomoya
 Asami Mizukawa – Kana Suma

References

External links
 TV drama official website 
 TV special official website 

2006 manga
2009 Japanese television series debuts
2010 manga
2011 Japanese television series endings
Japanese drama television series
Japanese television dramas based on manga
Josei manga
Kodansha manga
Manga adapted into television series
Nippon TV dramas